Lisa Taddeo is an American author and journalist known for her book Three Women. Taddeo's work has appeared in The Best American Political Writing and The Best American Sports Writing anthologies.

Early life
Taddeo was born in Short Hills, New Jersey. Her parents are Peter Taddeo, an Italian American doctor, and Pia, a fruit stand cashier from Italy.

Education
She first attended New York University but transferred to Rutgers University. Taddeo completed her Master of Fine Arts in fiction at Boston University.

Writing
Taddeo was an associate editor at Golf Magazine when David Granger assigned her first piece for Esquire, "The Last Days of Heath Ledger", after reading her unpublished novel.  

In 2015 The Washington Post named her New York Magazine piece, "Rachel Uchitel is Not A Madam", one of their top five long reads that stand the test of time.  

In 2013 she appeared in Esquire Network's 80th Anniversary special.  

She was awarded the William Holodnok Fiction Prize and the Florence Engel Randall Award in fiction.

Taddeo is a two-time recipient of the Pushcart Prize, for her short stories "42 (2017)", published in the New England Review, and "Suburban Weekend (2019)", published in Granta.

Her book Three Women was released in July 2019 by Simon and Schuster. 

In June 2020 it won the narrative non-fiction book of the year at the British Book Awards.

Animal, her debut novel, was published by Avid Reader Press in the summer of 2021, and is about "both sisterhood and female rage..."

Television 
In July 2019, Showtime announced a series commitment adaptation of Three Women. Taddeo will write and be executive producer of the series.

Bibliography
 Three Women (2019)
 Animal (2021)
 Ghost Lover (2022)

References 

Year of birth missing (living people)
Living people
American writers of Italian descent
21st-century American journalists
Boston University alumni
American women journalists
People from Millburn, New Jersey
Writers from New Jersey
New York University alumni
Rutgers University alumni
Millburn High School alumni
People from West Tisbury, Massachusetts
21st-century American women